The Pasteur effect describes how available oxygen inhibits ethanol fermentation, driving yeast to switch toward aerobic respiration for increased generation of the energy carrier adenosine triphosphate (ATP).

Discovery
The effect was described by Louis Pasteur in 1857 in experiments showing that aeration of yeasted broth causes cell growth to increase while the fermentation rate decreases, based on lowered ethanol production.

Explanation
Yeast fungi, being facultative anaerobes, can either produce energy through ethanol fermentation or aerobic respiration. When the O2 concentration is low, the two pyruvate molecules formed through glycolysis are each fermented into ethanol and carbon dioxide. While only 2 ATP are produced per glucose, this method is utilized under anaerobic conditions because it oxidizes the electron shuttle NADH into NAD+ for another round of glycolysis and ethanol fermentation.

If the concentration of oxygen increases, pyruvate is instead converted to acetyl CoA, used in the citric acid cycle, and undergoes oxidative phosphorylation. Per glucose, 10 NADH and 2 FADH2 are produced in cellular respiration for a significant amount of proton pumping to produce a proton gradient utilized by ATP Synthase. While the exact ATP output ranges based on considerations like the overall electrochemical gradient, aerobic respiration produces far more ATP than the anaerobic process of ethanol fermentation. The increased ATP and citrate from aerobic respiration allosterically inhibit the glycolysis enzyme phosphofructokinase 1 because less pyruvate is needed to produce the same amount of ATP.

Despite this energetic incentive, Rosario Lagunas has shown that yeast continue to partially ferment available glucose into ethanol for many reasons. First, glucose metabolism is faster through ethanol fermentation because it involves fewer enzymes and limits all reactions to the cytoplasm. Second, ethanol has bactericidal activity by causing damage to the cell membrane and protein denaturing, allowing yeast fungus to outcompete environmental bacteria for resources. Third, partial fermentation may be a defense mechanism against environmental competitors depleting all oxygen faster than the yeast's regulatory systems could fully switch from aerobic respiration to ethanol fermentation.

Practical implications
The fermentation processes used in alcohol production is commonly maintained in low oxygen conditions, under a blanket of carbon dioxide, while growing yeast for biomass involves aerating the broth for maximized energy production. Despite the bactericidal effects of ethanol, acidifying effects of fermentation, and low oxygen conditions of industrial alcohol production, bacteria that undergo lactic acid fermentation can contaminate such facilities because lactic acid has a low pKa of 3.86 to avoid decoupling the pH membrane gradient that supports regulated transport.

See also 
 Ethanol fermentation
 Fermentation (biochemistry)
 Facultative anaerobic organism
 Allosteric regulation

References

Further reading 

 

Fermentation
Metabolism